Daniel Imperiale (born 22 April 1988) is an Argentine footballer who plays for Deportes Iquique as a midfielder.

References

External links

Daniel Imperiale at Footballdatabase

1988 births
Living people
Argentine footballers
Argentine expatriate footballers
Association football midfielders
Argentine sportspeople of Chilean descent
Sportspeople from Mendoza Province
CSyD Tristán Suárez footballers
Independiente Rivadavia footballers
Quilmes Atlético Club footballers
Club de Gimnasia y Esgrima La Plata footballers
Sportivo Italiano footballers
San Martín de Mendoza footballers
Deportivo Maipú players
Club Atlético Tigre footballers
Cafetaleros de Chiapas footballers
Deportes Iquique footballers
Argentine Primera División players
Primera Nacional players
Primera B Metropolitana players
Ascenso MX players
Argentine expatriate sportspeople in Mexico
Argentine expatriate sportspeople in Chile
Expatriate footballers in Mexico
Expatriate footballers in Chile